Ansty is a village and civil parish in the Rugby Borough of Warwickshire, England, about  northeast of Coventry city centre and 7 miles (13 km) south of Hinckley. Ansty was part of the County of the City of Coventry until that county was dissolved in 1842.
Ansty is on the B4065, which used to be the main road between Coventry and Hinckley.

The northern section of the Oxford Canal, once a major coal-carrying network and now a popular leisure resource, passes through the village.  Ansty has been cited as "the most boater-hostile village on the canals" because of the huge number of "no mooring" signs.

History
The Domesday Book of 1086 mentions Ansty as part of the hundred of Brinklow. The main landowner was Lady Godiva. Its toponym comes from Old English Ānstīg meaning "one-path", i.e. "lonely or narrow path" or "path linking other paths".

The Church of England parish church of Saint James has a 13th-century chancel. The arcade between the nave and north aisle is 14th century. Sir George Gilbert Scott rebuilt the rest of the church in 1856.

Ansty Hall, just outside the village, was built in 1678 for Richard Taylor, who had been on the Parliamentarian side in the English Civil War. The house is arranged in seven bays and built of brick with stone quoins and pediment. It is now the Ansty Hall Hotel.

A cottage industry of weaving developed in the parish from early in the 18th century. This grew into a substantial ribbon-making trade early in the 19th century, but declined in the 1830s.

James Brindley completed the section of the Oxford Canal through Ansty in 1771.

In the 1940s, 1950s and 1960s, Armstrong Siddeley Motors had its development plant for gas turbines and aircraft rocket motors as well as the Gamma rocket motors used in the Black Knight and Black Arrow launchers. The plant is now the Ansty engineering works of Rolls-Royce. In 2013, Rolls-Royce announced the closure of the military part of the plant. The civil part of the plant remains unaffected.

In 2012, Ansty erected its first War Memorial, a black obelisk, after the hard work of local villagers headed by Chief Petty Officer Dean Bateman.

In 2017 Geely Commercial Vehicles (London Electric Vehicle Company) established a major production facility for EV taxis and vans 1.5 miles south of the village at Ansty Park (separated by the M6 motorway).

Amenities
Ansty has a gastropub restaurant, The Rose and Castle just beside the canal and The Ansty Club on Grove Road. There is also The Ansty Golf Club which is open to none members.

Gallery

References

Sources

External links

 

Villages in Warwickshire